Percy Eugene Foreman (June 21, 1902 – August 25, 1988) was a criminal defense attorney from Houston, Texas. Foreman was born near Bold Springs, Texas. Foreman moved to Livingston, Texas, when he was six years old. He was the son of Ransom Parson Hill Foreman and William Pinckney (Rogers) Foreman, a former sheriff of Polk County, Texas. Percy Foreman attended Staunton Military Academy in Virginia for one year, graduated from the University of Texas Law School in 1927, and was admitted to the Texas Bar on January 17, 1928. He went on to become one of the best known trial lawyers in Texas, with the Texas Criminal Defense Lawyers Association creating the Percy Foreman Lawyer of the Year Award in 1984.

Foreman was a respected master of tactics. He lost only 53 of 1500 death-penalty cases and only one case resulted in execution (Steve Mitchell, electrocuted in Texas in 1951).

Foreman's clients included General Edwin Walker, James Earl Ray, Charles Harrelson, Candy Mossler, and various organized crime kingpins.

Jack Ruby requested that Foreman represent him after he shot Lee Harvey Oswald.

Famed defense attorneys Richard Haynes and Dick DeGuerin both worked with Foreman early in their careers and credit him as a mentor.

In 1966, Foreman received the Golden Plate Award of the American Academy of Achievement.

Family
Percy Foreman had two marriages with the second, to Marguerite Obert, lasting from April 21, 1957 until her death in 1979. Foreman adopted his son, William Foreman, with his first wife and had his daughter, Marguerite Foreman, with his second wife. His sister Carrin Foreman was superintendent of the Sugar Land Independent School District from 1924 to 1930. When she married she gave up her position. She died on March 1, 1932, due to childbirth.

See also

Dominick Dunne's Power, Privilege, and Justice (episode: The Candy Scandal)
Judd, for the Defense (television series with main character reportedly based on Percy Foreman)

Notes

1902 births
1988 deaths
Texas lawyers
Criminal defense lawyers
People from Livingston, Texas
University of Texas School of Law alumni
20th-century American lawyers